Meir Litvak (born 1958) is the Chair of the Department of Middle Eastern and African History at Tel Aviv University.

Works

References

 

Israeli historians of religion
Middle Eastern studies scholars
Academic staff of Tel Aviv University
Living people
1958 births